Susanne Glesnes (born 1 December 1974 in Bergen) is a female professional beach volleyball player from Norway, who represented her native country at the 2004 Summer Olympics in Athens, Greece. Partnering Kathrine Maaseide she claimed the silver medal at the 2004 European Championships in Timmendorfer Strand, Germany.

References

External links
 
 
 

1974 births
Living people
Norwegian beach volleyball players
Women's beach volleyball players
Olympic beach volleyball players of Norway
Beach volleyball players at the 2004 Summer Olympics
Beach volleyball players at the 2008 Summer Olympics
Sportspeople from Bergen